Charles Edward Creighton (born August 6, 1876 - died July 30, 1949) was an Irish-American soccer referee.

Born in Belfast, Ireland, Creighton moved to the United States in his twenties.  He was selected to referee the first National Challenge Cup in 1914.  He was again in the middle for the 1918 National Challenge Cup, 1927 National Challenge Cup and the first game of the 1931 National Challenge Cup.  He also refereed two American Cup championship finals, one in 1917.  On November 6, 1926, he refereed his only international match, a U.S. win over Canada.

External links
 The Man in the Middle

1876 births
1949 deaths
Sportspeople from Belfast
Irish emigrants to the United States (before 1923)
American soccer referees